Theodoros Papaloukas (Greek: Θεόδωρος Παπαλουκάς; born May 8, 1977), commonly known as Theo Papaloukas or Thodoris Papaloukas, is a retired Greek professional basketball player. He was a four - time All-EuroLeague selection, a member of the EuroLeague 2000–10 All-Decade Team and was named one of the 50 greatest EuroLeague contributors in 2008. A revolutionary figure in basketball, as illustrated by his unique ability to come off the bench and alter the course of an encounter, and his uncanny feel for the game, he symbolized the rise of European basketball in the new millennium.

Papaloukas started his career in 1995, with his local club of Ampelokipoi, before being transferred two years later to Dafni, and then to Panionios in 1999. His performances with the latter earned him a transfer to EuroLeague powerhouse Olympiacos, where in 2002, he won his first title, the Greek Cup. A year later, he moved to Moscow for CSKA, the club that he would help to regain its past glory. After making a minimal impact during his first two seasons in the Russian capital, he evolved into a major contributor to CSKA's success, playing as a sixth man in the 2004–05 season, both in the EuroLeague and the Russian Super League A.

In 2006, Papaloukas led CSKA to their first EuroLeague title in thirty-five years, and thus earning an All-EuroLeague First Team selection and the EuroLeague Final Four MVP award in the process. The following year, he cemented his status as a EuroLeague competition icon, after being named the EuroLeague MVP, before falling short of a second straight EuroLeague title in the championship's final against Panathinaikos. In 2008, he won his second EuroLeague title with CSKA, in what would be his last year in Moscow. In the summer of 2008, Papaloukas returned to Olympiacos, and with them he reached another two EuroLeague Final Fours, thereby giving him a then record of eight consecutive EuroLeague Final Four appearances, a record he shared at the time with his former teammate J.R. Holden. On December 12, 2013, he was honored with a EuroLeague Basketball Legend Award.

Papaloukas helped lead the Greece men's national basketball team to a title, EuroBasket 2005, and a silver medal in 2006 FIBA World Championship. He was elected to the All-Tournament Team in both competitions. Papaloukas took part in two Olympic tournaments, in 2004 and 2008, with Greece finishing in their personal all-time best fifth position on both occasions. In 2006, he was named the FIBA Europe Men's Player of the Year.

Professional career

Early years
A native of Athens, Greece, Papaloukas began his big career at the small local Athens junior team Ethnikos Ellinoroson. He then played for another small, but at the time rising club, called Ampelokipoi, with whom he began his pro career in 1995. He then transferred to Dafni of the Greek 2nd Division in 1997, and transferred again two years later to Panionios, a traditional basketball club of the top-tier level Greek Basket League. With Dafni, Papaloukas won the Greek 2nd Division title, and the Greek 2nd Division Player of the Year award, in the 1998–99 season.

In 2001, Papaloukas finally moved to Olympiacos, a long-time Greek League power, as well as one of the perennial contenders in the EuroLeague. With Olympiacos, he led the Greek Basket League in assists in the 2000–01 and 2001–02 seasons. After the 2001–02 season, he left Olympiacos, and moved to another EuroLeague powerhouse, the Russian Super League A club CSKA Moscow, in 2002.

CSKA Moscow
After three disappointing years, at the club level, Papaloukas was a main factor helping the team win the 2005–06 EuroLeague title, the club's first EuroLeague title in 35 years, with a clutch performance in the 2006 Final Four - 19 points in the semifinal against FC Barcelona, and another 18 points at the final against the then back-to-back European champions, Maccabi Tel Aviv, which led to him being awarded him the Final Four MVP award; after he was also named the best point guard of the EuroLeague for that season. Alongside him on the All-EuroLeague First Team, were the best shooting guard, Juan Carlos Navarro of Barça, the best small forward, Anthony Parker of Maccabi (the 2005–06 EuroLeague MVP), the best power forward, Luis Scola of TAU Cerámica, and the best center, Nikola Vujčić of Maccabi.

In 2007, Papaloukas was voted the EuroLeague MVP of 2006–07 EuroLeague season. CSKA advanced to the final against Panathinaikos, which was held on the Greens' home court, the Athens Olympic Indoor Hall (which had been chosen as the site more than a year in advance). Panathinaikos won the game, by a score of 93–91, in a very exciting game. Papaloukas scored 23 points and dished out 8 assists, but a number of sportswriters intimated that he did not receive adequate support from his CSKA teammates, and thus his team lost the final. Papaloukas was also a key member of CSKA's 2007–08 EuroLeague championship team.

Papaloukas was then pursued in free agency by the NBA clubs the Boston Celtics, Los Angeles Lakers, Milwaukee Bucks, and the Miami Heat to fill their point guard spot. However, on July 7, 2007, Greek newspapers reported that Papaloukas agreed to a newly structured 3-year contract with CSKA, worth €10.5 million net income.

Olympiacos 
On June 20, 2008, one year after his contract extension with CSKA, Papaloukas used an option to leave his contract with no buyout to sign a three-year contract with Olympiacos with an annual salary of €3.5 million net income.

In the first two years of his contract, he helped Olympiacos reach the EuroLeague Final Four, averaging 8 points and 5.2 assists in the EuroLeague 2008–09 season, and 7.4 points and 5.1 assists in the EuroLeague 2009–10 season. In the third, and last, year of his contract, the team failed to advance to the EuroLeague Final Four, losing 3 games to 1 to Montepaschi Siena in the EuroLeague quarterfinal playoffs, despite having the home court advantage.

Maccabi Tel Aviv 
On August 13, 2011, Papaloukas signed a contract with the Israeli team Maccabi Tel Aviv, the finalists of the 2010–11 EuroLeague. In Macccabi, Papaloukas didn't get much playing-time, averaging only 9.1 minutes per game in the EuroLeague, and playing in only 8 Israeli Super League 2011–12 season games. The shortage of playing-time led to his release, after only one disappointing season with the yellows.

Back to CSKA Moscow 
In December 2012, Papaloukas was invited to a tryout with CSKA Moscow. He was signed by the team, and then officially returned to the court in a EuroLeague game against Anadolu Efes, on December 28, 2012. After the end of the 2013 EuroLeague Final Four in London, he announced his retirement from playing professional basketball, effective at the end of the season.

National team career
Papaloukas was part of the core element of the Greece men's national basketball team. He played at the following EuroBaskets: EuroBasket 2001 in Turkey, EuroBasket 2003 in Sweden, EuroBasket 2005 in Serbia and Montenegro, and EuroBasket 2007 in Spain.

Papaloukas, who was already well-established in European basketball as a result of appearances in three consecutive EuroLeague Final Fours with CSKA Moscow, achieved an acclaimed position among the elite of European basketball at the EuroBasket 2005 in Serbia and Montenegro. After a series of mediocre performances in the first round, he led Greece to a victory over the Russian National Basketball Team in the quarterfinals, and orchestrated a major comeback against the French National Basketball Team in the semifinal, when Greece was down 7 points with 47 seconds left on the clock.

In the final against the German National Basketball Team, led by the prodigious NBA All-Star Dirk Nowitzki, Papaloukas scored 22 points, leading Greece comfortably to its second European title, eighteen years after its first win at the EuroBasket 1987. As such, Papaloukas was selected to the All-Tournament Team of the EuroBasket 2005, along with fellow Greek team player Dimitris Diamantidis, Spanish National Basketball Team shooting guard Juan Carlos Navarro, French National Team swingman and NBA player Boris Diaw, and Nowitzki, who also claimed the MVP title.

Papaloukas also joined the elite club of players who have achieved the European title at both the national team and club levels during the same year, as he won the EuroLeague title with CSKA at the Final Four in Prague, April 28–30, 2006.

Papaloukas climbed to the second position of global basketball as he, along with his fellow Greek team players, drove Greece to the final of the 2006 FIBA World Championship in Japan, losing there in the final to the Spanish National Basketball Team. The win of the Greece national team over Team USA in the semifinal, by a score of 101–95, had Papaloukas with 12 assists, 8 points and 5 rebounds. He also earned a place on the All-Tournament Team, which also included the tournament MVP Pau Gasol of Spain, Gasol's teammate Jorge Garbajosa, Carmelo Anthony of Team USA, and Manu Ginóbili of Argentina.

His most formidable personal recognition came on January 26, 2007, when he was voted by fans and journalists as the FIBA Europe Men's Player of the Year for 2006, topping the likes of Nowitzki, Gasol, and Tony Parker. In the summer of 2008, Papaloukas became the captain of Greece's national team for the 2008 Olympic Games. It was also the last time he ever played for Greece's national team.

Player profile
Papaloukas was a 2.00 m (6 ft 6  in) tall (102 kg (225 lb.) player who could play as either a point guard, shooting guard, or point forward on both the offensive and defensive ends of the court. He was a pass-first play maker with a distinctive style of play. His play making ability and pass first point guard skills at his height, combined with his versatility to play multiple positions on the basketball court on both ends of the floor made him an extraordinary player.

Papaloukas was selected to the EuroLeague's 50th anniversary 50 Greatest EuroLeague Contributors list in 2008. Papaloukas is widely known by the nicknames of Teó and Thodoris. As a player, he was also sometimes given other much less used nicknames, such as The Computer, due to his ability to analyze the court, The Thread, because of his unique ability to complete passes through opposing defenses, like threading a needle, and other nicknames like Paps, Pappas, and The Tsar.

Post playing career
After he retired from playing professional basketball, Papaloukas was named a EuroLeague Legend, and also an official ambassador of the EuroLeague. He also became a member of the EuroLeague's official technical rules committee.

EuroLeague career statistics

|-
| style="text-align:left;"| 2001–02
| style="text-align:left;"| Olympiacos
| 19 || 13 || 26.9 || .468 || .333 || .671 || 2.9 || 4.0 || 2.0 || .2 || 8.4 || 10.2
|-
| style="text-align:left;"| 2002–03
| style="text-align:left;"| CSKA
| 21 || 1 || 16.4 || .453 || .280 || .630 || 2.0 || 3.4 || 1.1 || .0 || 4.7 || 8.0
|-
| style="text-align:left;"| 2003–04
| style="text-align:left;"| CSKA
| 21 || 0 || 17.4 || .453 || .172 || .782 || 1.7 || 2.7 || 1.5 || .1 || 6.3 || 8.5
|-
| style="text-align:left;"| 2004–05
| style="text-align:left;"| CSKA
| 23 || 0 || 18.5 || .611 || .412 || .679 || 2.3 || 3.8 || 1.3 || .1 || 7.6 || 11.3
|-
| style="text-align:left;background:#AFE6BA;"| 2005–06†
| style="text-align:left;"| CSKA
| 24 || 0 || 22.7 || .549 || .275 || .736 || 3.1 || 4.0 || 1.8 || .3 || 9.3 || 13.9
|-
| style="text-align:left;"| 2006–07
| style="text-align:left;"| CSKA
| style="background:#CFECEC;"| 25* || 3 || 24.4 || .578 || .341 || .716 || 3.2 || style="background:#CFECEC;"| 5.4* || 1.7 || .2 || 9.8 || 15.3
|-
| style="text-align:left;background:#AFE6BA;"| 2007–08†
| style="text-align:left;"| CSKA
| 23 || 0 || 21.8 || .500 || .242 || .690 || 2.7 || 4.6 || 1.2 || .0 || 7.7 || 11.2
|-
| style="text-align:left;"| 2008–09
| style="text-align:left;"| Olympiacos
| 22 || 2 || 25.1 || .612 || .368 || .636 || 2.7 || style="background:#CFECEC;"| 5.2* || 1.1 || .0 || 8.0 || 11.5
|-
| style="text-align:left;"| 2009–10
| style="text-align:left;"| Olympiacos
| 19 || 0 || 24.4 || .561 || .351 || .643 || 2.1 || 5.1 || 1.3 || .1 || 7.4 || 10.4
|-
| style="text-align:left;"| 2010–11
| style="text-align:left;"| Olympiacos
| 18 || 0 || 21.4 || .470 || .214 || .609 || 2.6 || 3.8 || 1.6 || .0 || 5.4 || 8.1
|-
| style="text-align:left;"| 2011–12
| style="text-align:left;"| Maccabi
| 20 || 1 || 9.6 || .435 || .333 || .720 || 1.1 || 1.6 || .6 || .0 || 3.0 || 3.5
|-
| style="text-align:left;"| 2012–13
| style="text-align:left;"| CSKA
| 17 || 0 || 11.1 || .379 || .333 || .786 || 1.5 || 2.3 || .5 || .1 || 2.2 || 3.5
|- class="sortbottom"
| style="text-align:left;"| Career
| style="text-align:left;"|
| 252 || 20 || 20.1 || .526 || .300 || .694 || 2.4 || 3.9 || 1.3 || .1 || 6.8 || 9.9

Awards and accomplishments

Pro clubs
 
 Greek 2nd Division Champion: (1999)
 Eurobasket.com's Greek 2nd Division Player of the Year: (1999)
 3× Greek League assists leader: (2001, 2002, 2009)
 5× Greek League All-Star: (2001, 2002, 2009, 2010, 2011)
 3× Greek Cup Winner: (2002, 2010, 2011)
 7× Russian League Champion: (2003–08, 2013)
 3× Russian Cup Winner: (2005–07)
 3× Russian League Player of the Year (2005, 2006, 2007)
 Russian Cup MVP: (2006)
 2× EuroLeague Champion: (2006, 2008)
 4× All-EuroLeague Team: (2006, 2007, 2008, 2009)
 2× All-EuroLeague First Team: (2006, 2007)
 2× All-EuroLeague Second Team: (2008, 2009)
 EuroLeague Final Four MVP: (2006)
 Triple Crown Champion: (2006)
 FIBA Europe Men's Player of the Year: (2006)
 All-Europe Player of the Year: (2006)
 2× EuroLeague assists leader: (2007, 2009)
 EuroLeague MVP: (2007)
 EuroLeague Finals Top Scorer: (2007)
 50 Greatest EuroLeague Contributors: (2008)
 EuroLeague 2000–10 All-Decade Team: (2010)
 Israeli State Cup Winner: (2012)
 Adriatic League Champion: (2012)
 Israeli Super League Champion: (2012)
 VTB United League Champion: (2013)
 EuroLeague Basketball Legend: (2013)
 101 Greats of European Basketball: (2018)
 Greek Basket League Hall of Fame: (2022)

Greek national team
 
 7× Acropolis Tournament Champion: (2000, 2002, 2003, 2005, 2006, 2007, 2008)
 EuroBasket 2005: 
 EuroBasket All-Tournament Team: (2005)
 2006 FIBA Stanković World Cup: 
 2006 FIBA World Championship: 
 2006 FIBA World Championship: All-Tournament Team
 2008 FIBA World OQT:

References

External links
 
 Theo Papaloukas' Official Twitter 
 Euroleague.net Profile
 Eurobasket.com Profile
 Interbasket.net Profile
 Draftexpress.com Profile
 FIBA.com Papaloukas All First Team 2006 FIBA World Championship
 FIBAEurope.com Papaloukas Voted Best European Player
 From FIBA Europe Official Website: "Papaloukas Legend Grows With FIBA Europe Player Of Year Honor" {January 26, 2007} by Jeff Taylor
Hellenic Basketball Federation Profile 

1977 births
Living people
ABA League players
Ampelokipoi B.C. players
Basketball players at the 2004 Summer Olympics
Basketball players at the 2008 Summer Olympics
Dafnis B.C. players
Eastern Orthodox Christians from Greece
FIBA EuroBasket-winning players
Greece national basketball team players
Greek men's basketball players
Greek Basket League players
Israeli Basketball Premier League players
Maccabi Tel Aviv B.C. players
Olympiacos B.C. players
Olympic basketball players of Greece
Panionios B.C. players
PBC CSKA Moscow players
Point guards
Shooting guards
Small forwards
Basketball players from Athens
2006 FIBA World Championship players
Greek expatriate basketball people in Russia
Greek expatriate basketball people in Israel